Zlatna levica, priča o Radivoju Koraću is a 2011 Serbian biopic and documentary film directed by Gordan Matić. It tells the story of Radivoj Korać, a famous Serbian basketball player.

The film premiered in August 2011 in Kaunas during EuroBasket 2011 ahead of the tournament's knockout stage where it was screened for members of FIBA Europe, journalists covering the tournament, and representatives of the national teams that made the quarterfinals. In December 2011 it was shown at the film festival in Palermo. It premiered in Serbia on 16 February 2012.

After its theatrical life, it is set to be broadcast as three-episode television mini-series during fall 2012.

Plot
The documentary part is narrated by basketball players Saša Đorđević and Milenko Tepić featuring appearances by Korać's contemporaries such as Ivo Daneu, Josip Đerđa, Dragutin Čermak, Pedro Ferrándiz, Clifford Luyk, etc.

The feature part dramatizes events from Korać's life.

Cast
Vladimir Aleksic (glumac) ... Radivoj Korać
Voja Brajović ... Josip Broz Tito
Tihomir Stanić ... Ivo Andrić
Katarina Radivojević ... Radivoje Korać's mother

References

External links

Златна левица, прича о Радивоју Кораћу - official movie website

2011 films
2010s Serbian-language films
Serbian documentary films
Films set in Yugoslavia
Films set in Serbia
2011 documentary films
Documentary films about basketball
Basketball films
Cultural depictions of Josip Broz Tito
Cultural depictions of Serbian men
Basketball in Serbia